Shake It All About (Danish: En kort en lang, literally "A Short [One], a Long [One]") is a 2001 Danish comedy-drama directed by Hella Joof. It was entered into the 24th Moscow International Film Festival.

Plot
The film is about gay couple Jørgen and Jacob, who live in a happy partnership. Jacob asks Jørgen to marry him, and he happily accepts. However, Jacob falls in love with the woman Caroline, who happens to be married to Tom, Jørgens brother. Jacob is torn because he wants both Jørgen and Caroline. Jacob gets Caroline pregnant and wants to do the right thing by marrying her. Jacob can stay secret for only so long.

Cast
Mads Mikkelsen as Jacob
Troels Lyby as Jørgen
Charlotte Munck as Caroline
Jesper Lohmann as Tom
Oskar Walsøe as Oskar
Peter Frödin as Frederik
Nikolaj Steen as Mads
Ditte Gråbøl as Inge
Morten Kirkskov as Adrian
Henning Jensen as Palle
Pernille Højmark as Ellen
Ellen Hillingsø as Anne
Ghita Nørby as Bine
Thomas Winding as Hans Henrik
Klaus Bondam as The priest

Reception
The film has been noted for its narrative exploration of sexual fluidity.

References

External links 
 

2001 films
2001 comedy-drama films
Danish LGBT-related films
2000s Danish-language films
Gay-related films
Male bisexuality in film
2001 comedy films
2001 drama films
Danish comedy-drama films
LGBT-related comedy-drama films
2001 LGBT-related films